Robert Gorges   was an Anglican priest in Ireland during the second half of the 18th century.

Gorges was  educated at Trinity College, Dublin. He was the incumbent at Termonfeckin then Dean of Kilmacduagh from 1771 until his death in 1802.

References

Alumni of Trinity College Dublin
Deans of Kilmacduagh
18th-century Irish Anglican priests
1802 deaths